Deh Bin (also Romanized as Deh Bīn) is a village in Ahmadabad Rural District, in the Central District of Firuzabad County, Fars Province, Iran. At the 2006 census, its population was 589, in 122 families.

References 

Populated places in Firuzabad County